Jade Abigail Holland Cooper (born 1986) is a British fashion designer.

Early life
Her father, Oliver Cooper, is a farmer in Suffolk, and her mother, Miranda (née Holland), worked in London and Paris as a designer, making clothes for Elton John, amongst others. She was born on the family farm, Manor Farm, in Elmsett, near Hadleigh.

Oliver Cooper grew up on Great Bricett Hall Farm, including the grade I listed farmhouse Great Bricett Hall in the village of Great Bricett, Suffolk. It was home to his father Rupert Cooper, who died in October 2017, aged 96. The estate, including 415 acres of land, was listed for sale in June 2018 at £4.65 million.

She was educated at Ipswich High School for Girls, then studied international equine and agriculture management at the Royal Agricultural College in Cirencester, but dropped out to start a career in fashion.

Career
In 2008, she founded the fashion label Holland Cooper.

She started by having an outworker employed by her mother make 30 tweed miniskirts, with leather and suede additions, which she found in her mother's old design studio in a farm outbuilding, and sold them all from a stall at Badminton Horse Trials.

Personal life
In August 2018, she married Julian Dunkerton, co-founder of Superdry.

They have one child, Saphaïa Isabella Dunkerton, born November 2020.

In 2021, she was one of the guests at Lady Kitty Spencer's wedding.

References

External links

British fashion designers
1987 births
Living people
People educated at Ipswich High School, Suffolk
People from Hadleigh, Suffolk